Barry William Donath (30 December 1932 – 1 December 2001) was an Australian athlete. He competed in the men's shot put at the 1956 Summer Olympics.

References

1932 births
2001 deaths
Athletes (track and field) at the 1956 Summer Olympics
Australian male shot putters
Olympic athletes of Australia
Place of birth missing
Commonwealth Games medallists in athletics
Commonwealth Games bronze medallists for Australia
Athletes (track and field) at the 1958 British Empire and Commonwealth Games
Medallists at the 1958 British Empire and Commonwealth Games